Right to Reply (sometimes called R2R) is a British television series shown on Channel 4 from 1982 until 2001, which allowed viewers to voice their complaints or concerns about TV programmes. It featured reports, usually presented by a viewer, and interviews with the programme-makers concerned.

History
Right to Reply was more serious and less humorous than its BBC equivalent Points of View. Also, R2R discussed all channels' programmes, although, originally, only "Channel Four programme makers [were] called to account"; after a few years R2R started to discuss ITV shows as well, and soon also added BBC, and later satellite/cable shows. Points of View only commented on BBC programmes, and continues to today.

Some notable episodes and reports included:
"Manhattan Transfer" (first broadcast 8 February 1985) , an entire episode about John Wilcock, who hosted a New York cable TV public access show about TV.
Right to Reply'''s covering of a controversial sex scene in The Singing Detective in 1986, which caused some viewers to complain about Right to Reply, which was possibly Simon Cowell's debut TV appearance.

A notable feature of Right to Reply was the "video box", which gave viewers a third means of communicating with the programme in the 1980s, alongside letter or telephone. In the late 1990s (until 2001) the "Right to Reply 500", a group of 500 TV viewers, answered weekly online surveys about current television issues.

Cancellation
Channel 4's 2001 decision to end Right to Reply, after a run of more than 18 years, was criticised by its fans, since nothing similar remains in its place. Some have said that the cancellation was representative of Channel 4's move into the mainstream and unwillingness to take risks like it did in the 1980s - said one viewer, "the Channel 4 that I view today has evolved into just another TV channel".

Reinstatement
On 24 May 2007, Ofcom ordered the reinstatement of a Channel Four Right to Reply programme in its adjudication of the 2007 Celebrity Big Brother race row. The TV Show'' was shown once a month on Channel 4, but by the end of the second series, the show was cancelled due to poor ratings and reviews.

References

External links
BFI.org.uk: Overview of content in many Right to Reply episodes, 1982-2001
Viewer Dom Robinson reviews his experience on R2R, 2001
 

Channel 4 original programming
British television talk shows
1990s British television series
1982 British television series debuts
2001 British television series endings
Television series about the media
Criticism of journalism